Infinite Games is the second studio album by American electronic band The Black Queen, released independently on September 28, 2018.

Critical reception 
Infinite Games has been critically acclaimed since its release. On review aggregator website, Album of the Year, Infinite Games has an average rating of 80 out of 100 based on three contemporary critic reviews indicating critical acclaim.

Track listing

Charts

Accolades

References

2018 albums
The Black Queen (band) albums
Self-released albums